The Battle of Guam (21 July–10 August 1944) was the American recapture of the Japanese-held island of Guam, a U.S. territory in the Mariana Islands captured by the Japanese from the United States in the First Battle of Guam in 1941 during the Pacific campaign of World War II. The battle was a critical component of Operation Forager. The recapture of Guam and the broader Mariana and Palau Islands campaign resulted in the destruction of much of Japan's naval air power and allowed the United States to establish large airbases from which it could bomb the Japanese home islands with its new strategic bomber, the Boeing B-29 Superfortress.

Background
Guam, at 212 square miles (543 square kilometers), is the largest island of the Marianas, with a length of 32 miles (52 km) and a width ranging from 12 miles (19.31 km) to four miles (6.44 km) at different points of the island. It had been a United States possession since its capture from Spain in 1898 until it was captured by the Japanese on 10 December 1941, following the attack on Pearl Harbor. During the Japanese occupation of Guam, it was not as heavily fortified as the other Mariana Islands such as Saipan that had been Japanese possessions since the end of World War I. But by 1944, Guam had a large Japanese garrison.

The Allied plan for the invasion of the Marianas, Operation Forager, called for heavy preliminary bombardment, first by carrier aircraft and USAAF bombers based in the Marshall Islands to the east, then once air superiority was gained, close bombardment by battleships, cruisers, and destroyers. Saipan, Tinian, and Guam were chosen as the targets due to their size and suitability as a base for supporting the next stage of operations toward the Philippines, Taiwan, and the Ryukyu Islands. The seaport at Apra Harbor was suitable for the largest ships; and air bases for Boeing B-29 Superfortresses could be built from which to bomb Japan. B-24 Liberators from the Marianas could also bomb Iwo Jima and the Bonin Islands, such as Chichi Jima.

The invasion of Saipan was scheduled for 15 June 1944, with landings on Guam tentatively set for 18 June. The original timetable was optimistic, however. A large Japanese carrier attack and stubborn resistance by the unexpectedly large Japanese garrison on Saipan led to the invasion of Guam being postponed for a month.

U.S. naval and air bombardments lasted from 11 to 13 June 1944, involving 216 carrier aircraft and land-based B-24 bombers from the Marshall Islands. On 12 and 13 June, 12 Japanese cargo ships and several fishing vessels were sunk. On 27 June, U.S. Navy battleships and cruisers started shelling the island, joined by a U.S. carrier group on 4 July, and two more on 6 July.

Opposing forces

 United States
US Fifth Fleet
Admiral Raymond A. Spruance, USN
Southern Attack Force (Task Force 53) 
Vice Admiral Richard L. Conolly, USN
Expeditionary Troops
Lieutenant General Holland M. Smith, USMC
Approx. 48,200 officers and enlisted
III Marine Amphibious Corps
Major General Roy S. Geiger, USMC
 Northern landing area: 
  3rd Marine Division
 Maj. Gen. Allen H. Turnage, USMC
 Southern landing area:
  1st Provisional Marine Brigade
 Brig. Gen. Lemuel C. Shepherd Jr., USMC
 Reserve:
  77th Infantry ("Statue of Liberty") Division
 Maj. Gen. Andrew D. Bruce, USA

 Japan
Army Forces
Lieutenant General Takeshi Takashina (KIA 28 July)
Thirty-First Army
Lieutenant General Hideyoshi Obata (committed suicide 11 August)
Approx. 11,500 officers and enlisted
 29th Division (Lt. Gen. Takashina) (elements)
 48th Independent Brigade
 9th Tank Regiment (2 companies)
 10th Independent Mixed Regiment
 Army weapons:
 14 x 105 mm howitzers
 18 x 75 mm field guns (10 "new" type)
 40 x 75 mm pack howitzers (mountain)
 9 x 70 mm infantry guns
 8 x 75 mm mobile AA guns
 6 x 20 mm AA machine cannon
 24 x 81 mm mortars
 9 x 57 mm AT guns
 30 x 47 mm AT guns
 47 x 37 mm AT guns
 231 x 7.7 mm machine guns
 349 x 7.7 mm light machine guns
 540 x 50 mm grenade dischargers
 29 x Type 95 Ha-Go tanks
 10 x Type 97 Chi-Ha tanks
 1 x Type 97 Chi-Ha "Shinhoto" tank
Navy Forces

54th Navy Special Police Unit (Capt. Yutaka Sugimoto) (2,300 personnel, including coast defense and AA)

Two Naval construction battalions (each 900, 1,800 total)

IJNAS ground crews, logistics and maintenance personnel (2,000)

Miscellaneous (1,000)

Battle

Before landing, US forces sought to ensure both air and naval superiority. A total of 274 ships, which fired 44,978 shots from 2-inch and 5-inch guns supported the landing. In addition, a total of 13 aircraft carriers participated in the air raid and a total of 4,283 bombs (weighing a total of 1,310 tons) were dropped from 18 to 20 July, the day before disembarkation. The heavy bombardment burned all the palm trees on the beach and destroyed every building that could be seen. Experience gained by the Japanese from the invasion of Saipan was used to try to mitigate the effects of the bombardment. Despite this, the bombardment far exceeded the expectations of the defending forces which were dug in along the coast as they were on Saipan. Many of the bases and guard towers were also destroyed. However, artillery pieces entrenched in dense forests, caves, trenches and locations four kilometers or more from the coast were able to escape destruction and became a source of heavy Japanese resistance. Guam, ringed by reefs, cliffs, and heavy surf, presents a formidable challenge for any attacker. Underwater demolition teams reconnoitered the beaches and removed obstacles from 14 to 17 July. Despite the obstacles, on 21 July, the American forces landed on both sides of the Orote Peninsula on the western side of Guam, planning to secure Apra Harbor. The 3rd Marine Division landed at Asan near Agana to the north of Orote at 08:29, and the 1st Provisional Marine Brigade landed near Agat to the south. Japanese artillery sank 30 U.S. LVTs and inflicted heavy casualties on the landing troops, especially of the 1st Provisional Marine Brigade, but by 09:00 marines and tanks were ashore at both beaches.

Japanese counterattacks were made throughout the first few days of the battle, mostly at night, using infiltration tactics. The Japanese penetrated the American defenses several times but were driven back with heavy losses of men and equipment.

The U.S. Army's 77th Infantry Division had a more difficult landing on 23–24 July. Lacking amphibious vehicles, they had to wade ashore from the edge of the reef where the landing craft dropped them off. The men stationed in the two beachheads were pinned down by heavy Japanese fire, making initial progress inland quite slow. Supply was very difficult for the landing troops on Guam in the first days of the battle. Landing ships could not come closer than the reef, several hundred yards from the beach, and amphibious vehicles were scarce.

The 1st Provisional Brigade blocked off the Orote Peninsula on 25 July, and that same night Japanese Lt. General Takashina counterattacked, coordinated with a similar attack against the 3rd Division to the north. The next day, General Obata reported, "our forces failed to achieve the desired objectives." Takashina was killed on 28 July, and Lieutenant General Hideyoshi Obata took over the command of the Japanese defenders. On 28 July, the two beachheads were linked, and by 29 July, the Americans secured the peninsula.

The Japanese counterattacks against the American beachheads, as well as the fierce fighting, had exhausted the Japanese. At the start of August, they were running out of food and ammunition, and they had only a handful of tanks left. Obata withdrew his troops from southern Guam, planning to make a stand in the mountainous central and northern part of the island, "to engage in delaying action in the jungle in northern Guam to hold the island as long as possible".

After ensuring that no significant Japanese forces operated in the southern portion of Guam, Marine Major General Geiger started an offensive north with the 3rd Marine Division on the left flank and the 77th Infantry Division on the right, liberating Agana on the same day. The Tiyan Airfield was captured on 1 Aug.

Rain and thick jungle made conditions difficult for the Americans, but after an engagement with the main Japanese line of defense around Mount Barrigada from 2–4 August, the Japanese line collapsed. The 1st Provisional Brigade formed up on the left flank of the 3rd Marine Division on 7 August because of the widening front and continued casualties, in an effort to prevent the Japanese from slipping through the American gaps. The Japanese had another stronghold at Mount Santa Rosa, which was secured on 8 August.

On 10 August, organized Japanese resistance ended, and Guam was declared secure, but 7,500 Japanese soldiers were estimated to be at large. The next day, Obata committed ritual suicide at his headquarters on Mount Mataguac after he had sent a farewell message to Japan.

Aftermath

A few Japanese soldiers held out in the jungle after the fighting on Guam. On 8 December 1945, three U.S. Marines were ambushed and killed. Sergeant Masashi Itō surrendered on 23 May 1960, after the last of his companions was captured. On 24 January 1972, Sergeant Shoichi Yokoi was discovered by hunters on the island. He had lived alone in a cave for 28 years, near Talofofo Falls.

Guam was turned into a base for Allied operations after the battle. 5 large airfields were built by the Navy Seabees and African American Aviation Engineering Battalions.  Army Air Forces B-29 bombers flew from Northwest Field and North Field on Guam to attack targets in the Western Pacific and on mainland Japan.

Guam's native Chamorro population had suffered considerably during Japanese occupation, and the Japanese soldiers began to commit atrocities during the preparation for the invasion. In what became known as the Maneggon March, the Japanese soldiers forced most of the island's population to march into six concentration camps in southern Guam. The sick and starving were left for dead along the way, and Japanese troops massacred about 600 civilians out of Guam's population of roughly 20,000. As many as 2,000 may have been killed during the occupation. Liberation Day continues to be celebrated on Guam every 21 July.

Unit awards
Navy Unit Commendation:
1st Provisional Marine Brigade, 21 July to 10 August 1944

Medal of Honor recipients
Four Medal of Honor recipients of the Battle of Guam:
Captain (later General) Louis H. Wilson, Jr., USMC
Private First Class Leonard F. Mason, USMC (posthumous)
Private First Class (later Corporal) Luther Skaggs Jr., USMC
Private First Class Frank Witek, USMC (posthumous)

See also
18th Infantry Regiment (Imperial Japanese Army)
Agana race riot – Violent confrontation between white U.S. Marines and black U.S. sailors
Battle of Guam (1941)
Pacific War Museum
Return to Guam, 1944 documentary and propaganda film about the battle
The War in the Pacific National Historical Park
George Ray Tweed
Nimitz Hill

Notes

References

Further reading

Manchester, W., 1980, Goodbye, Darkness: A Memoir of the Pacific War, Boston: Little, Brown, and Co., pp 278–302

External links

"The Marianas and the Great Turkey Shoot", World War II Database.
Lodge, Major O.R. USMC Historical Monograph: The Recapture of Guam, Historical Branch, United States Marine Corps, 1954.
O'Brien, Cyril J. Liberation: Marines in the Recapture of Guam, Marines in World War II Commemorative Series, Marine Corps Historical Center, United States Marine Corps, 1994.

Photos from the Liberation of Guam  The Real Revo

Pacific War Museum National Park Service site

Conflicts in 1944
Guam, 1944
Battle, 1944
Battle, 1944
World War II operations and battles of the Pacific theatre
Guam (1941)
Guam (1941)
Guam 1944
Amphibious operations of World War II
July 1944 events
August 1944 events
Amphibious operations involving the United States
Military in Guam